Extracellular sulfatase Sulf-2 is an enzyme that in humans is encoded by the SULF2 gene.

Function 
Heparan sulfate proteoglycans (HSPGs) act as coreceptors for numerous heparin-binding growth factors and cytokines and are involved in cell signaling. Heparan sulfate 6-O-endosulfatases, such as SULF2, selectively remove 6-O-sulfate groups from heparan sulfate. This activity modulates the effects of heparan sulfate by altering binding sites for signaling molecules (Dai et al., 2005).[supplied by OMIM]

References

Further reading 

 
 
 
 
 
 

Extracellular matrix remodeling enzymes